Matthäus Hipp also spelled Matthias or Mathias (Blaubeuren, 25 October 1813 – 3 May 1893 in Fluntern) was a German clockmaker and inventor who lived from 1852 on in Switzerland.
His most important, lastingly significant inventions were electrical looms, traffic signals, and pendulum clocks as well as Hipp's Chronograph.

Biography 
The son of Grain Miller at a monastery, Hipp was born 25 October 1813 in Blaubeuren, Württemberg. At the age of eight, he had an accident climbing on one of the many rocks there, and was lame for the rest of his life. At the age of sixteen, he became apprenticed to the clockmaker Johan Eichelhofer in his hometown of Blaubeuren. At the conclusion of his apprenticeship he began his Wanderjahre.
In 1832 after working in Ulm for clockmaker Valentin Stoß, in 1834 he worked in the Swiss town of St. Gallen, afterwards between 1835 and 1837 in the clock factory Savoie in St. Aubin.
In 1840, he moved to Reutlingen in Germany and opened a workshop there in 1841 at the age of 28.
In the same year he married Johanna Plieninger, a teacher's daughter. The couple had four children.

After the suppressed revolution in Baden in the year 1849 his application for director of the clockmaker school in Furtwangen was rejected for political reasons, because he was regarded as a democrat. Consequently, in 1852, Hipp decided to leave Germany. He was appointed by the Swiss government as the director of the national telegraph workshop and technical director of the telegraph administration. Although Hipp's agreement explicitly allowed him to also continue working privately, when his privately derived income far exceeded his salary for public service, there arose conflicts with the Swiss administration and parliament. Hipp responded in 1860 by resigning from the Swiss government service.

The next part of his life career led him from Bern to Neuchâtel, where he took over the directorship of a newly established telegraph factory. 
Not until 1889 did Hipp relinquish management and hand over control of the company to the engineers A. Favarger and A. De Peyer. From then until 1908 the factory carried the logo "Peyer & Favarger, Succ. de M. Hipp".

Soon after his retirement he moved to Fluntern to be near his daughter in Zürich. On 3 May 1893, Matthäus Hipp died at the age of eighty in Fluntern. His wife outlived him by four years. Hipp, who since 1852 lived and worked in Switzerland, but never gave up his nationality, received the honorary name of "the Swiss Edison".

Achievements 

Matthäus Hipp in the course of 40 years brought more than 20 inventions to technical maturity. Some of his inventions proved so good that for approximately one hundred years without changes in basic design these inventions could be manufactured and sold. For its time, Hipp's electrical pendulum clock was a technological breakthrough.

 1843 description of a pendulum clock driven by a special escapement called "echappement à palette".
 1847 Chronoscope 
 1854 Two-way telegraphy on the same line
 1855 Electrical loom
 1856 He laid a cable of his own construction from Vierwaldstättersee to Flüelen
 1862 Hipp's "Wendescheibe", an automatic visual railway signal
 1862 He installed a clock system with an ultra-precise master clock and slave clocks in Geneva
 1863 May 27 French patent for an electrical driven pendulum clock with hipp-toggle: "Pendule ou horloge électro-magnétique à appal direct d’électricité"
 1866 He developed in collaboration with Frédéric William Dubois an electrical Registrierchronographen with marine chronometer
 1867 Electrical clavier
 1874 He delivered to Vienna a chronograph for the observation of nerve activity
 1881 High precision electrical observatory clock for the Observatoire Cantonal de Neuchâtel
 1889 Registering speedometers

Honors 
 1840 high  Württemberg honor „für sein im Uhrenbau neues, sinnreiches Prinzip zur Erzielung eines gleichformigen Pendelgangs“ (for his ingenious principle for the achievement of a homogeneous pendulum escapement, new in the building of clocks)
 1873 Ritterkreuz of the Austrian Order of Franz Joseph
 1875 Ehrendoktorwürde (Dr. phil. E. h.) from the Universität Zürich.

References 

 
 
 Helmut Kahlert: Lorenz Bob und Matthäus Hipp in „Alte Uhren und moderne Zeitmessung“; Callwey Verlag München; Nr.4 1987 S.22f
 G. H. Baillie: Watchmakers & Clockmakers of the World; 
 R. Weber, L. Favre: Matthäus Hipp : 1813-1893, Bulletin de la Société des Sciences Naturelles de Neuchâtel, Band 24 (1895-1896), S.212f SEALS

External links 

 Stadt Blaubeuren: Berühmte Köpfe
 Die Entwicklungsgeschichte der Elektrischen Uhren: Matthäus Hipp
 Tram-Museum Zürich: Der registrierende Geschwindigkeitsmesser System Hipp
 watch-wiki: Matthäus Hipp
Video of the Wendescheibe model SchBB, which shows its function
 The Electro-Mechanical Piano  Matthias Hipps  and the Electro-Mechanical Piano on '120 years Of Electronic Music'

1813 births
1893 deaths
People from Alb-Donau-Kreis
People from the Kingdom of Württemberg
19th-century German inventors
German clockmakers
German emigrants to Switzerland